Statistics of Qatar Stars League for the 2005–06 season.

Overview
It was contested by 10 teams, and Al-Sadd Sports Club won the championship.

League standings

References
Qatar - List of final tables (RSSSF)

2005–06 in Asian association football leagues
2005–06 in Qatari football